Corden is a surname. Notable people with the surname include:

Charles Corden (1874–1924), English cricketer, who played 17 times for Worcestershire between 1900 and 1903
Henry Corden (1920–2005), Canadian-born American actor and voice artist who took over the role of Fred Flintstone after Alan Reed died in 1977
James Corden (born 1978), English actor, television writer, producer and presenter
W. Max Corden (born 1927), Australian economist
Wayne Corden (born 1975), professional footballer currently playing for Non League side Leek Town
William Corden the Elder (1795–1867), English portrait painter and miniaturist known for his commissions from the Royal Family in the 19th century

See also
Horne & Corden, British sketch show
James Corden's World Cup Live, comedy chat show hosted by comedian James Corden during the 2010 FIFA World Cup
List of Horne & Corden episodes